North Kolkata encompasses the northern part of Kolkata, including the city's oldest neighbourhood. 

Shyambazar, Bagbazar, Kumartuli, Shobhabazar, Posta, Jorasanko, Rajabazar, Phoolbagan, Maniktala, Kankurgachi, Ultadanga, Chitpur, Belgachia, Tala, Cossipore, and Sinthee are among its many neighbourhoods. Old heritage buildings and temples are there, as well as Shovabazar Rajbari. Because of its rich cultural heritage, it is commonly referred to as Babu Kolkata. 

It hosts palatial structures including Laha Bari, Pathuriaghata Ghosh Bari, and Thakur Bari. North Kolkata houses the main campuses of several universities, including the University of Calcutta, Presidency University, and Rabindrabharati University. This area hosts railway junctions and metro stations. It is also the business center hub, stretching from Sinthee Crossing to Chiriamore Crossing to Shyambazar Crossing to Burrabazar. Property values in North Kolkata are above average due to its central location.

History
North Kolkata was previously known as Sutanuti village. It was located there along with two other villages, Gobindopur and Kalikata. This region of Kolkata was the capital of British India until 1911, along with other two regions, Middle and South.

References

External links

Geography of Kolkata
Neighbourhoods in Kolkata